The Universidade do Extremo Sul Catarinense (Unesc) is a community university, located in the municipality of Criciúma, in the southern part of Santa Catarina, Brazil. It works through education, research and extension in different areas of knowledge. It was the first institution of higher education to be deployed in the southern state of Santa Catarina. 

The current dean of UNESC is Luciane Bisognin Ceretta, elected in 2017 by the academic community.

External links 
 

Educational institutions established in 1968
1968 establishments in Brazil
Education in Santa Catarina (state)
Private universities and colleges in Brazil
Universities in Brazil